Cuulong Fish JSC is a fishery company in Vietnam, specializing in farming and processing two species of pangasius, a genus of catfish, Pangasius bocourti and Pangasius hypophthalmus (the iridescent shark).  The company's main facilities are in Long Xuyen City in An Giang Province, adjacent to the Mekong River. Cuulong processes over 80,000 tons of pangasius per year. Products include frozen fillets, breaded fillets, fishsticks, nuggets and fish sausage.  Cuulong Fish's stock is listed at the Ho Chi Minh Securities Trading Center.

See also

 Fish farm
 Fish processing
 List of seafood companies

References

External links
Cuulong Fish JSC
Cuulong Fish at Alacrastore
Cuulong Fish at Bloomberg
Cuulong Fish JSC at Google finance
Cuulong Fish at Ho Chi Minh Securities Trading Center

Companies listed on the Ho Chi Minh City Stock Exchange
Fish farming companies
Long Xuyen
Seafood companies of Asia
Fishing in Vietnam
Food and drink companies of Vietnam